Enteromius liberiensis is a species of ray-finned fish in the genus Enteromius from Sierra Leone and Liberia.

Footnotes 
 

Enteromius
Taxa named by Franz Steindachner
Fish described in 1894